El Rostro de la Venganza (Lit: The Face of Vengeance / English: Facing Destiny) is a Spanish-language telenovela produced by United States-based television network Telemundo Studios, Miami. David Chocarro, Elizabeth Gutiérrez and Cynthia Olavarria starred as the protagonist, with the special participation of Maritza Rodríguez, while Saúl Lisazo and Marlene Favela starred as the antagonists.

History 
Telemundo announced a prime-time broadcast of El Rostro de la Venganza on May, as part of the 2012–2013 season. From June 23, 2012 to January 24, 2013, Telemundo aired El Rostro de la Venganza weeknights at 10:30pm/9:30c, following half-hour of Pablo Escobar: El Patrón del Mal. From January 28, 2013 and onwards, Telemundo aired one-hour episodes, replacing Pablo Escobar. The last episode was broadcast on April 12, with El Señor de los Cielos replacing it. As with most of its other telenovelas, the network broadcast English subtitles as closed captions on CC3.

Plot 
El Rostro de la Venganza tells the story of Diego Mercader (Jorge Eduardo García), an 8-year-old boy, bullied and harassed in school by his classmates. He suffers a breakdown and is urged by unknown persons to shoot 7 of his colleagues, being given access to a gun from a lockroom. Accused of the mass murder, he enters a prison for psychological diseases.

Twenty years later, psychiatrist Antonia Villaroel (Maritza Rodríguez) obtains his liberation by legal means and with the support of a generous benefactor Ezequiel Alvarado (Saúl Lisazo).

Diego is being given a new identity, the one of Martín Méndez (David Chocarro) and tries to renew his life under the employment of Ezequiel. He is put as the personal bodyguard of his fiancée, Mariana (Elizabeth Gutiérrez), compromised in an outrageous relationship with his son, Luciano (Jonathan Islas).

He will find himself in a maze of intrigues and betrayal, sustained by Antonia's decision to find the truth about the murders and by Ezequiel's family. Later Mariana and Antonia are killed by Alicia and Alicia takes the lead role and it is later revealed that she is Eva Samaniego out for revenge.

Cast changes 
The initial cast was announced to be Elizabeth Gutiérrez as Antonia, Iván Sánchez as Diego/Martín and Maritza Rodríguez as Mariana.

David Chocarro was originally to play Luciano Alvarado at the very beginning, nevertheless being rather proposed for the lead. The role of Luciano was given to the former leading actor Iván Sánchez, who was let out from the final production due to his constant discontent with the plot. Eventually, Jonathan Islas took the part.

Maritza Rodríguez and Elizabeth Gutiérrez exchanged roles; Rodríguez had been cast as Antonia, and Gutiérrez as Mariana.

After two weeks of broadcast, Gutiérrez announced she was leaving the production, thus letting the series without a female protagonist, as Rodríguez had only played a special role. The initial plot had to be changed, with her character getting killed halfway through.

Marlene Favela was cast in with a new role to substitute the lead. Marlene Favela's character was changed from a Protagonist to an Antagonist as the telenovela went on.

Cast

Main 

 Saúl Lisazo as Ezequiel Alvarado. Antagonistic protagonist, later becomes good
 Maritza Rodríguez as Antonia Villarroel. Co-protagonist. Killed by Valeria Samaniego
 Elizabeth Gutiérrez as Mariana San Lucas. Co-protagonist. Killed by Alicia
 David Chocarro as Diego Mercader / Martín Méndez. Main protagonist character
 Marlene Favela as Alicia Ferrer / Eva Samaniego. Main villain character, mysterious killer, killed 6 children in the past, loves Martín, ends up in jail

Recurring 
 Jonathan Islas as Luciano Alvarado. 
 Felicia Mercado as Valeria Samaniego.
 Roberto Mateos as Federico Samaniego
 Kimberly Dos Ramos as Katerina Alvarado
 José Guillermo Cortines as Alex Maldonado
 Cynthia Olavarría as Diana Mercader
 Gabriela Rivero as Laura Cruz
 Eduardo Serrano as Juan Mercader
 Rebeca Manríquez as Sonia Castro
 Jacqueline Márquez as Tania Stuardo
 Dayana Garroz as Carolina Pinto
 Paloma Márquez as Natalia García
 Wanda D'Isidoro as Verónica Baeza
 Chela Arias as Eliana Alvarado
 Martha Mijares as Manuela Cruz
 Héctor Fuentes as Salvador Casas
 Rafael León as Marcos Alvarado
 Cristian Carabias as Omar Mercader
 William Valdés as Miguel Ángel Samaniego
 Jorge Eduardo García as Juan "Juanito" Mercader / Young Diego Mercader
 Paulo Quevedo as Tomás Buenaventura
 Rodrigo de la Rosa as Víctor Leytón

Guest 
 Adriana Bermudez as Leticia "Lety"
 Sandra Destenave as Sol Luisa / Marcia Rey
 Lorena Gómez as Sandra Arriagada
 Emily Alvarado as Young Carolina Pinto
 Ginna Rodriguez as Young Diana Mercader

Awards

References

External links 
 

2012 American television series debuts
2013 American television series endings
American television series based on telenovelas
Telemundo telenovelas
2012 telenovelas
Spanish-language American telenovelas
Television shows set in New York City
Television shows set in Miami
Mass murder in fiction
Psychological thriller television series
Murder in television
Serial killers in television